Ankang (Chinese: 安康站; Pinyin: Ānkāng zhàn) is a light rail station of the Ankeng light rail, operated by the New Taipei Metro, in Xindian, New Taipei, Taiwan.

Station overview
The station has an elevated station with 1 side platform and 1 island platform. It is located on the intersection of Section 1, Anhe Road, and Section 1, Ankang Road.

Station layout

Around the station

 Ankang Flower Market

Bus connections
Buses 8, 202, 576, 624, 897, 913, 935, 951, O1, and O9 stop at this station.

History
Construction of the station started on November 7, 2013, and finished in 2022. The station opened on February 10, 2023.

See also

 Ankeng light rail
 New Taipei Metro
 Rail transport in Taiwan

References

External links
 New Taipei Metro Corporation

 New Taipei City Department of Rapid Transit

Ankeng light rail stations